Runaway Brain is a 1995 American animated comedy-horror short film produced by Walt Disney Feature Animation. Featuring Mickey Mouse and Minnie Mouse, the short centers on Mickey attempting to earn money to pay for an anniversary gift for Minnie. He responds to an advertisement to work for Dr. Frankenollie, but finds that the doctor is looking for a donor to switch brains with the monster he created. Featuring animation by animator Andreas Deja, it was first released in 1995 attached to North American theatrical showings of A Kid in King Arthur's Court, in 1996 attached to international theatrical showings of A Goofy Movie and in 1999 attached to Australian theatrical showings of Toy Story 2. It would be the final original Mickey Mouse theatrical animated short until Get a Horse! in 2013.

The short received a mixed reception from audiences, and was nominated for the Academy Award for Best Animated Short Film at the 68th Academy Awards, losing to the Wallace and Gromit short A Close Shave. Later references to the cartoon have been made in Disney related media such as the video game Kingdom Hearts 3D: Dream Drop Distance.

Plot
On a dark and stormy evening, Minnie arrives at Mickey's house to find him playing a Snow White and the Seven Dwarfs video game and becomes angry over Mickey having forgotten that it is the anniversary of their first date. Mickey comes up with the last-minute idea to take her to a miniature golf course and shows her a newspaper ad for it, but she instead notices another ad for a trip to Hawaii, which costs $999.99, and mistakes it for Mickey's gift. Mickey frets over how he can make enough money for the trip when Pluto shows him the want ads, and Mickey sees an ad from Dr. Frankenollie to earn the amount of money that he needs for "a mindless day's work".

Upon reaching the home of Dr. Frankenollie, Mickey is dropped down a trapdoor into Frankenollie's laboratory, the monkey-like doctor reveals a plan to switch Mickey's brain with that of his enormous monster, Julius. The experiment causes an explosion that kills Frankenollie, but the brain transfer is a success, with Mickey's mind ending up in Julius' giant body and Julius in control of Mickey's body.

The dimwitted and insane Julius finds Mickey's wallet and notices a photo of Minnie, whom he instantly becomes smitten with. He escapes from the laboratory and finds Minnie while she is shopping for swimsuits, Minnie immediately mistakes Julius for Mickey. Mickey arrives in Julius' body to save Minnie, but Minnie becomes terrified of his appearance and screams for help, until Mickey convinces her of who he is and places her on the top of a skyscraper.

Julius continues to pursue Minnie, leading to a battle between Mickey and Julius during which they land on a telephone line and get electrocuted, switching their minds back to their original bodies. Mickey continues to fight Julius, the two of them reaching the top of the tower, where Mickey manages to rescue Minnie as well as tie Julius down with rope. Mickey uses a billboard for a Hawaiian vacation to suspend Julius over the city streets, with the giant reeling up and down like a yo-yo.

Mickey and Minnie travel to Hawaii together on an inflatable boat pulled by Julius as he swims after the photo of Minnie in Mickey's wallet, which is attached to a fishing line held by Mickey.

Voice cast
Wayne Allwine as Mickey Mouse
Russi Taylor as Minnie Mouse
Kelsey Grammer as Dr. Frankenollie
Jim Cummings as Julius
Bill Farmer as Pluto

Production
After celebrating Mickey Mouse's 60th anniversary in 1988, Disney sought new animated projects with the character. The director of Runaway Brain, Chris Bailey recalled "If you were a director or part of the development, if you were between assignments, you were asked to develop Mickey shorts," although only The Prince and the Pauper (1990) had seen production prior to his project. Bailey at first saw approval from studio president Jeffrey Katzenberg and Disney Animation executives Thomas Schumacher and Peter Schneider regarding the rework an idea he had for a Roger Rabbit short, "Tourist Trap," with Mickey and Donald Duck heading on a vacation, and Donald attempting to kill Mickey, but after a failed storyboard presentation, he pitched Runaway Brain. Jim Beihold was assigned with layout, Ian Gooding served as art director, and Andreas Deja, who had animated Scar in The Lion King (1994), developed the monstrous version of Mickey possessed by Julius based on Bailey's sketches. Disney Animation France, who was just finishing A Goofy Movie (1995), was given the animation job. While the crew was in France, Katzenberg left Disney, leaving Bailey without one of the executives who most backed his ideas. While the first screening of the mostly completed short to the executives was successful, Schumacher and Schneider went on to order many changes that would cut scenes and require others to be newly animated. These included not having the monstrous Mickey drooling, toning Mickey's electrocution to be more cartoonish, and having the ending with Julius chasing an "effigy Minnie" made of pillows be replaced with having him pursue the wallet picture.

Cultural references
The beginning of the cartoon shows Mickey playing a satirical version of fighting games such as the Mortal Kombat and Street Fighter series, with Dopey and the Queen from Snow White and the Seven Dwarfs (1937) fighting each other. Director Chris Bailey said that Jeffrey Katzenberg was the one who suggested a scene with a video game, and Bailey came up with the fighting game after his idea of a first-person shooter based on Bambi (1942) was rejected. The general plot of the cartoon refers back to the Mary Shelley novel Frankenstein, with Dr. Frankenollie and Julius being heavily inspired by Victor Frankenstein and Frankenstein's monster. The composite name "Frankenollie" comes from the names of animators Frank Thomas and Ollie Johnston, who were two of Disney's Nine Old Men.

Mickey's wallet contains a photo of him piloting the boat from Steamboat Willie (1928). Mickey also whistles music from Steamboat Willie before he goes into the laboratory. The wallet also features a library card from the fictional 'Guillard County Library', a reference to actor/director/producer/writer Stuart Gillard. The theme song from Steamboat Willie was also used for the closing credits.

Warner Bros.' seminal horror film The Exorcist (1973) is referenced in a shot where Mickey first arrives at Frankenollie's laboratory, the imagery mirroring Father Merrin's arrival at Regan MacNeil's house.

Zazu from The Lion King (1994) briefly appears twice, once when Mickey is sucked down into the laboratory and again when Julius roars at Mickey.

One of the objects seen when Mickey gets sucked down into the lab is a pink slip with the initials "JK" on it. This is a reference to Katzenberg, who left Disney in 1994 and went on to form rival studio DreamWorks with Steven Spielberg and David Geffen.

Release and reception
In terms of general reception, the macabre nature of the animation's plot brought criticism from some Disney fans due to the contrast with the previously light tone of Mickey Mouse cartoons. Andy Mooney, then chairman of Disney's consumer products unit, remarked to the Los Angeles Times in 2003 that "the very fact that Mickey was possessed was very disturbing" to some audiences, though the character "overcomes that".

The film was screened out of competition at the 1996 Cannes Film Festival. It was first released in North America on August 11, 1995, with A Kid in King Arthur's Court, then on September 12, 1996, with The Hunchback of Notre Dame in Australia and on October 18, 1996, attached to A Goofy Movie in the UK. The short was to be re-released with 101 Dalmatians, which was sent to theaters with the short attached in 1996, but Disney asked theater owners to cut the short off all film prints and replace it with trailers for then upcoming Disney films, including Hercules and George of the Jungle. In July 1997, Disney attached it to George of the Jungle.

The cartoon was nominated the Academy Award for Best Animated Short Film at the 68th Academy Awards, ending up losing to A Close Shave starring Wallace and Gromit.

Home media
The short was released on May 18, 2004 on Walt Disney Treasures: Mickey Mouse in Living Color, Volume Two: 1939-Today.

It is also available as a Movies Anywhere-exclusive digital download with the Walt Disney Animation Studios Short Films Collection (but is not included on the Blu-Ray/DVD disc set).

In other media
This cartoon was featured in the video game Disney's Magical Mirror Starring Mickey Mouse.

Julius appears as an optional secret boss in Kingdom Hearts 3D: Dream Drop Distance in Traverse Town.

See also
Mickey Mouse (film series)

References

External links

Runaway Brain at The Encyclopedia of Disney Animated Shorts

1995 films
American horror short films
American fantasy films
American science fiction comedy films
Mad scientist films
Mickey Mouse short films
1995 comedy films
1995 animated films
Films scored by John Debney
1990s Disney animated short films
American monster movies
Body swapping in films
Films about brain transplants
1990s monster movies
1995 short films
1990s science fiction films
1990s English-language films